Lock-On is a 1986 first-person combat flight simulator video game with a futuristic theme. It was developed by Tatsumi and licensed to Data East for US distribution. Its graphics feature scaling sprites and a full-screen rotation effect. The game consists of 20 levels. Gameplay is similar to After Burner: the plane follows a predefined path, but the player can steer it slightly to evade incoming missiles. The player can fire guns and homing missiles, the latter of which requires the eponymous lock-on first.

Reception 
In Japan, Game Machine listed Lock-On on their June 15, 1987 issue as being the eleventh most-successful upright arcade unit of the month.

References

External links

Lock-On at Atari Mania

1986 video games
Arcade video games
Atari ST games
Rail shooters
Tatsumi (company) games
Video games developed in Japan